Meghan Elizabeth Kallman (born November 18, 1983) is an American politician, academic, and activist serving as a member of the Rhode Island Senate from the 15th district. Elected in November 2020, she assumed office on January 5, 2021.

Education 
Kallman earned a Bachelor of Science degree from Smith College, a Master of Arts from the University of Chicago, and a PhD from Brown University. Kallman's scholarship focuses on development sociology, environmental sociology, and organizational sociology.

Career 
Kallman began her career at Amnesty International, and then was a marketing manager for Prize4Life. From 2008 to 2011, she was the research director for Urban Innovation Analysis, a 501(c) organization. From 2014 to 2018, she was an instructor at the Community College of Rhode Island. From 2017 to 2021, she served as a member of the Pawtucket City Council. She is an associate professor at the University of Massachusetts Boston at the graduate School for Global Inclusion and Social Development, and an adjunct professor at Brown University. In 2015, Kallman co-founded Conceivable Future, a nonprofit organization that advocates for climate and reproductive justice.

Kallman was elected to the Rhode Island Senate in November 2020 and assumed office on January 5, 2021. She is also vice chair of the Senate Housing and Municipal Government Committee.

Bibliography (selected) 

 Kallman, Meghan Elizabeth. 2020. The Death of Idealism: Development and Anti-Politics in the Peace Corps. Columbia University Press.
 Malin, Stephanie A., and Meghan Elizabeth Kallman. 2022. Building Something Better: Environmental Crises and the Promise of Community Change. New Brunswick, New Jersey: Rutgers University Press.
 Kallman, Meghan Elizabeth, and Terry Clark. 2016. The Third Sector: Community Organizations, NGOs, and Nonprofits. Urbana: University of Illinois Press.

References 

Living people
1983 births
American sociologists
Smith College alumni
University of Chicago alumni
Brown University alumni
Brown University faculty
University of Massachusetts Boston faculty
Democratic Party Rhode Island state senators
Women state legislators in Rhode Island